Jack A. Wells (1908 - April 15, 1980) was an American corporate lawyer at the New York City, New York-based law firm Royall, Koegel & Wells, a firm that later became Rogers & Wells.

From 1941 to 1942 he served as President of The New York Young Republican Club.

In 1972, William J. Casey, chairman of the United States Securities and Exchange Commission, appointed him to an SEC committee to review and evaluate the commission's enforcement policies and practices. Casey appointed him because he was not a securities lawyer and asked him to be the chairman of the committee, and thus began what we now know as the "Wells Committee". In 1972, the committee proposed the process in which the SEC would notify people or firms ahead of enforcing action on them, also known as the Wells notice.

In 1977, Wells represented the airline Air France in its lawsuit against the Port Authority of New York and New Jersey in trying to get the rights for Concorde flights into New York City's John F. Kennedy International Airport.

See also

 Wells notice
 Attorneys in the United States
 List of people from New York City

References

Place of birth missing
20th-century births
20th-century American businesspeople
20th-century United States government officials
21st-century American businesspeople
American law firm executives
Businesspeople from New York City
New York (state) lawyers
U.S. Securities and Exchange Commission personnel
Wesleyan University alumni
Alumni of the University of Oxford
Harvard Law School alumni
1908 births
1980 deaths